The Canton of Saint-Sulpice-les-Champs was a canton situated in the Creuse département and in the Limousin region of central France. It was disbanded following the French canton reorganisation which came into effect in March 2015. It had 2,082 inhabitants (2012).

Geography 
An area of farming and forestry, with the town of Saint-Sulpice-les-Champs, in the arrondissement of Aubusson, at its centre. The altitude varies from 350m (Saint-Martial-le-Mont) to 681m (Saint-Michel-de-Veisse) with an average altitude of 546m.

The canton comprised 11 communes:

Ars
Banize
Chamberaud
Chavanat
Le Donzeil
Fransèches
Saint-Avit-le-Pauvre
Saint-Martial-le-Mont
Saint-Michel-de-Veisse
Saint-Sulpice-les-Champs
Sous-Parsat

Population

See also 
 Arrondissements of the Creuse department
 Cantons of the Creuse department
 Communes of the Creuse department

References

Saint-Sulpice-les-Champs
2015 disestablishments in France
States and territories disestablished in 2015